Saint-Pierre-du-Vauvray is a commune in the Eure department in Normandy in northern France.

Population

See also
Communes of the Eure department

References

External links

 Official Web site

Communes of Eure